The Surgeon General of the Air Force is the senior-most Medical Service officer in the United States Department of the Air Force and is the principal medical advisor for both the United States Air Force and United States Space Force. In recent times, this has been a lieutenant general who serves as head of the United States Air Force Medical Service (AFMS). The Surgeon General is usually the senior Medical Corps officer, but acting surgeons general have been from other branches of the medical service.

History 
In September 1947 the combat elements of the Army Air Forces separated from the U.S. Army, forming the United States Air Force. But a few Air Force support functions, such as medical care, remained U.S. Army responsibilities for the next two years. Starting in 1948, the Air Force and the Air Surgeon, Maj. Gen. Malcolm C. Grow (1887-1960), began to convince the U.S. Army and the administration of President Harry S. Truman that the Air Force needed its own medical service. In the summer of 1949, Air Force General Order No. 35 established a medical service with the following officer personnel components: Medical Corps, Dental Corps, Veterinary Corps, Medical Service Corps, Air Force Nurse Corps, and Women's Medical Specialist Corps.

List of Surgeons Generals

List of Deputy Surgeons Generals

 Brig Gen Olin F. McIlnay, 1945???
 Brig Gen Harry G. Armstrong, June 1949 - December 1949
 Brig Gen Dan C. Ogle, December 1949 - July 1954
 Maj Gen John K. Cullen, August 1959 - June 1961
 Maj Gen Richard L. Bohannon, June 1961 - December 1963
 Maj Gen Alonzo A. Towner, July 1966 - May 1970
 Maj Gen Maxwell Wensel Steel Jr., September 1, 1972 - August 1975
 Maj Gen Benjamin R. Baker, August 1975 - December 1976
 Maj Gen Garth B. Dettinger, December 1976 - May 1980
 Maj Gen James G. Sanders, October 1988 - October 1991
 Maj Gen Leonard M. Randolph Jr., November 1999 - July 2001
 Maj Gen James G. Roudebush, July 2001 - July 2006
 Maj Gen Charles B. Green, August 2006 - August 2009
 Maj Gen Byron C. Hepburn, August 2009 - November 2010
 Maj Gen Thomas W. Travis, November 2010 - July 2012
 Maj Gen Mark A. Ediger, July 2012-June 2015
 Maj Gen Dorothy A. Hogg, June 2015–June 2018
 Maj Gen Sean L. Murphy, June 2018-June 2021
 Maj Gen John DeGoes, June 2021-present

See also 
 Surgeon General of the United States
 Surgeon General of the United States Army
 Surgeon General of the United States Navy

References

External links 
 
 Chronology Of The Air Force Surgeons General

United States Air Force appointments
S

Military medicine in the United States
1948 establishments in the United States